New Zealand has had a domestic first-class cricket championship since the 1906–07 season. Since the 2009–10 season it has been known by its original name of the Plunket Shield.

History
The Plunket Shield competition was instigated in October 1906 with the donation of a shield by William Plunket, 5th Baron Plunket, who was the Governor-General of New Zealand from 1904 to 1910. For the 1906–07 inaugural season, the Shield was allotted by the New Zealand Cricket Council "to the Association whose representative team it considers to have the best record for the season". After the Council awarded the Shield to Canterbury, chiefly because Canterbury were the only provincial team to beat the visiting MCC, Auckland representatives complained that Auckland should have received the Shield as their team was superior but had not had the chance to prove it as none of the other provincial teams had played Auckland during the season.

Beginning with the 1907–08 season, the competition was decided by challenge matches among Auckland, Wellington, Canterbury, Otago and, on two occasions, Hawke's Bay. Auckland defeated Canterbury by an innings in the first challenge match in December 1907.

A proposal in 1912 that the Shield should be decided by an inter-provincial tournament rather than by the challenge system was rejected as impracticable at the time. However, starting with the 1921–22 season, the four principal teams (minus Hawke's Bay, which lost first-class status) played each other in a single round-robin series of matches. Central Districts entered the competition in 1950–51, and Northern Districts in 1956–57.

Shell Trophy
Shell Oil became principal sponsor in 1974–75 and a new trophy was introduced. Games were played over three days during this period, with an over-limit on the first innings. In latter years the format was experimented with, introducing a shorter second round, various bonus points systems, and eventually a knockout final. During this period the Plunket Shield was contested in occasional games between the North Island and South Island teams – they played a three-day match in December 1977 and one-day matches in the 1981–82, 1993–94 and 1994–95 seasons.

State Championship
The format and the principal sponsor were changed in 2001–02 season. State Insurance (more commonly just called 'State') replaced Shell Oil. The competitions were renamed to reflect the new sponsor's name, so despite the fact that New Zealand does not have political 'states', the correct name for the first-class competition was the 'State Championship'. Each of the provincial teams played in a single round-robin series of four-day matches. There was a target of 112 overs in each day's play. After the round-robin the two highest-ranked teams played a five-day final.

A List A 50-over competition known as the State Shield was run from late December to the end of January, culminating with a semi-final (second versus third) and final (the semi-final winner against the top qualifier) early in February.

In 2006, a provincial Twenty20 competition was begun, and was played during February and early March. The top two sides qualified for the final. It was called the State Twenty20.

Plunket Shield reinstated
When State Insurance withdraw from their sponsorship, the Plunket Shield was reinstated for the 2009–10 season. New Zealand Cricket has stated that the naming rights are no longer for sale and that the name Plunket Shield will remain. The final has also been abolished, meaning that the champion of the competition will be determined by the points leader at the end of the double round robin.

Teams

Former teams
Hawke's Bay played twice in the Plunket Shield, in the 1914/15 and 1920/21 seasons, losing both matches.

Points system
Points are awarded at the conclusion of each match during the season. With no final, the team with the most points is declared the champion. The points system for the 2019/20 season is as follows

Won: 12 points
Lost: 0 points
Draw: 0 points
Tie: 6 points
One-innings match won (match that started with 10 hours or less playing time remaining): 6 points 
One-innings match tie: 3 points
Abandoned (without a ball bowled) / No result (drawn one-innings match): 2 points
Batting points: First Innings only up to 110 overs – first point at 200 runs, second point at 250 runs, third point at 300 runs, fourth point at 350 runs
Bowling points: First Innings only up to 110 overs – first point at 3 wickets, second point at 5 wickets, third point at 7 wickets, fourth point at 9 wickets

Winners
The holders of the shield during its "challenge match" period to 1921 were:

From the 1921–22 season the competition has been run on a round robin format.

Statistics

Top run scorers and wicket takers by season

Record for most runs and wickets in a single season

Most Career Wickets

See also

 The Ford Trophy
 Hallyburton Johnstone Shield
 Men's Super Smash
 Women's Super Smash

References

External links
Detailed photograph of the Plunket Shield at Te Ara: The Encyclopedia of New Zealand
Plunket Shield at New Zealand Cricket

 
New Zealand domestic cricket competitions
First-class cricket competitions
Sports leagues established in 1906
1906 establishments in New Zealand